Thorndon is a village and civil parish in the Mid Suffolk district of Suffolk in eastern England. The village is located around three miles south of Eye, close to the A140. It is located 92 miles North East of London. In 2011 the population was 648, recorded by the 2011 census. Village facilities include All Saints' Church and a local primary school.

History
The origin of the name Thorndon, traces back to Old English meaning 'Thorn Hill', coming from 'þorn' meaning a hawthorn-tree and 'dūn' meaning A hill. Throndon was documented in the Doomsday book as being within the hundred of Hartismere in 1066, describing it as Hill where thorn-trees grow and having a population of just 43 people in 1086. It was also recorded to have two manors in 1066, the main one being owned by the Wulfeva family and the other owned by the Turchetal family. Twenty years after the invasion by William the Bastard, the feudal baron Robert Malet was tenant-in-chief.

In 1337, the manor was owned by Robert d'Ufford and All Saints' Church was added. In the 1870s, John Marius Wilson described it as:
A parish, with a village, in Hartismere district, Suffolk; 3 miles S of Eye r. station. The church is ancient but good, and has been restored. There are a reformatory, a national school, and town lands.
Thorndon is home to one church, All Saints' Church. Listed as a Grade II building since 1955, it displays exceptional 15th century carvings on its front of grinning lions and angels crafted locally in the nearby town of Occold.

The boundaries of Thorndon have not changed, with the parish being located to the south of Eye. In the early 19th century, the only education people of the parish received was at Sunday school, as there were no schools in the parish until 1833, when an infant school was built. However, in 1856, it was brought and turned into a reformatory by Sir Edward Kerrison. This was subsequently acquired by the Kerrinson Trust and turned into a conference centre for the parish to use.

Demographics
The earliest records of Thorndon's population date back to 1811, with the total population being 580. In 1851, it reached its highest total population of 725, but then slowly decreased to the last recorded figure of 468 from the 2011 census; this could be due to a number of reasons, such as industrialisation and people moving to urban areas. However, in 1931 it dipped to its lowest population. Thorndon was home to 272 houses in 2014; in modern times there has been a drop in population meaning less cramped living conditions compared to the 139 houses when population was at 675 in 1870.

90% of Thorndon is made up of White British people, with the other 10% being Black or Asian; this is mainly due to the rural location of the town.
Thorndon has an ageing population, with many being over 60 years old, shown by the census conducted in 2011

 

The Census Report of 2011 also shows that 90% of the population are of very good health or good health. This could be due to the affluent area of Thorndon is.

According to the 2011 census, the predominant occupation in Thorndon is agriculture and construction, this is due to the rural nature of the town. Other popular occupations include manufacturing and retail trade, which have become increasingly popular in recent years.

Places of interest

Church of All Saints A big church situated in the parish of Hartismere built in the 13th century by Robert De Ufford, Earl of Suffolk. Later improvements  include an oak screen built by Brian Atkinson, a local craftsman, which has allowed community activities to take place at the church, such as the "T Plus Community Café". Other community activities include the 'Cafe Church' which takes place on the last Sunday of every month. This brings the community of all ages together, giving them the opportunity to have something to eat whilst being entertained by the Parable Players. The Lych Gate as you enter the church, contains a village war memorial, for World War II.
The Black Horse A popular country pub in the heart of Thorndon. Originally built as the Black Horse Inn in the 1600s, it was later converted into a pub. In 1998 a fire destroyed most of the roof, but the pub was restored and reopened. The village no longer has its own post office, and so a mobile post office is parked up in the pub car park on some mornings.
Thorndon CEVC primary school The school is a Church of England Voluntary controlled school situated in the heart of the countryside. It caters for children from age 4-11 and welcomes any religion. However being a Church of England school it does associate itself with the church community and participates in church assemblies and celebrating other Christian events. The school currently has 64 students with up to 12 children per year group. Thorndon does not contain any secondary schools, the nearest one for residents to go to is Hartismere School and 6th Form College in Eye.
Thorndon Community Shop The community shop is open 7 days a week. It was originally run by the landlord of "The Black Horse", but has since been handed over to the community to run. It is staffed by local volunteers and additional funding has come from the parish, district and county councils. The shop stocks local produce including bread from the Tudor Bakehouse in Eye and milk from the Halesworth Dairy. There is also a photocopier available.
Thorndon Leek Club The club was founded in 1995, it celebrates the village community spirit by socials, competitions and local events.  The biggest event for them is the September show, held at the Black Horse. The club have regular meetings there to discuss village events and how to support the Church, School, Pub and other places in the Village.

References

External links

Villages in Suffolk
Civil parishes in Suffolk
Mid Suffolk District